MacGruber is an American action comedy television series based on the recurring Saturday Night Live sketch of the same name, a parody of the action-adventure series MacGyver. Produced as a sequel to the 2010 film of the same name, the series stars Will Forte as the title character, who goes up against Brigadier Commander Enos Queeth, a villain from his past. Kristen Wiig, Ryan Phillippe, Sam Elliott, Laurence Fishburne, Billy Zane, and Timothy V. Murphy also star. Co-produced by Universal Television and Broadway Video, filming took place in Albuquerque, New Mexico. The series was released on Peacock on December 16, 2021.

Cast

Main
 Will Forte as MacGruber
 Kristen Wiig as Vicki St. Elmo
 Ryan Phillippe as Dixon Piper
 Sam Elliott as Perry, MacGruber's father
 Laurence Fishburne as General Barrett Fasoose
 Billy Zane as Brigadier Commander Enos Queeth

Recurring
 Joseph Lee Anderson as Major Harold Kernst
 Timothy V. Murphy as Constantine Bach
 Marielle Heller as MacGruber's mom
 Maya Rudolph as Casey
 Stephanie Czajkowski as Bex Dawson
 Ella Ayberk as Irina Poliskaya 
 Mac Ericsson as Eli' MacGruber
 Vartan as Baker Jaxx
 Ryan Kendrick as Mac's Dad 
 Angel Rosario Jr. as Chance Tucker
 Landon Ashworth as Rodney

Episodes

Production

MacGruber was a recurring sketch on Saturday Night Live from 2007 to 2010, co-created by comedian Will Forte and writers Jorma Taccone and John Solomon. Forte starred as the title character, an absurdist parody of the MacGyver television franchise. The sketches proved popular enough for a 2010 film adaptation of the character. Though the film was a box-office bomb in its original theatrical release, a growing cult following in the ensuing years, and continued enthusiasm from the creative team, led to development of a sequel. Focus shifted to a television project when another film was not seen to be financially viable.

Following the cancelation of the sitcom The Last Man on Earth, which Forte created and starred in and Solomon wrote and directed, their focus returned to a MacGruber revival, which was pitched with Taccone to television networks in early 2019. In November 2019, Forte mentioned the possibility of Kristen Wiig and Ryan Phillippe returning to reprise their roles from the film.

The MacGruber series was officially announced on January 16, 2020 when NBCUniversal, the distributor of both Saturday Night Live and the 2010 film, revealed the inaugural development slate for their then-upcoming streaming service Peacock. By April 2020, the scripts for all eight episodes were near completion. In August 2020, production was delayed due to the COVID-19 pandemic. On August 10, 2020, the series was officially given a series order, with Wiig and Phillippe in negotiations to star.

Taccone invited director Christopher Nolan, who had publicly discussed his enjoyment of the 2010 film, to the initial table read for the series. Nolan was unable to attend, but sent an email regarding his anticipation for the project, including that "the world is waiting, the world is watching," which Taccone said was "an amazing way to start the read-through." In June 2021, production began in Albuquerque, New Mexico, and it was confirmed that Wiig and Phillippe would reprise their roles, with Sam Elliott, Laurence Fishburne, and Mickey Rourke being added to the cast. By August 2021, Rourke left the series and was replaced by Billy Zane. Joseph Lee Anderson would join the cast in a recurring role, with Timothy V. Murphy reprising his role from the film. Filming concluded on August 23, 2021.

All eight episodes of the first season were released on Peacock on December 16, 2021.

Reception
 On Metacritic, the series has a score of 64 out of 100 based on 11 critic reviews indicating "generally favorable reviews".

References

External links
 

 

2020s American comedy television series
2020s American parody television series
2021 American television series debuts
2021 American television series endings
American action comedy television series
American action television series
American sequel television series
English-language television shows
MacGyver (1985 TV series)
Peacock (streaming service) original programming
Saturday Night Live
Television series based on adaptations
Television series by Broadway Video
Television series by Universal Television
Television series impacted by the COVID-19 pandemic
Television shows filmed in New Mexico